Galo Edmundo Miño Jarrín  (6 February 1953 – 11 September 1986) was an Ecuadorian sports shooter.

Miño won a gold medal at the 1983 Pan American Games in Caracas, as a member of Ecuador's three-man side in the team competition of the Air Pistol. It was Ecuador's only medal of the games.

At the 1984 Summer Olympics, Miño competed in the 50 meter pistol event. He finished equal 23rd, from the 56 shooters in the field.

A police captain, Miño was killed aged 33, during a shootout with bank robbers in Quito.

References

External links
Galo Miño at Sports Reference

1953 births
1986 deaths
Ecuadorian male sport shooters
Olympic shooters of Ecuador
Shooters at the 1984 Summer Olympics
Pan American Games gold medalists for Ecuador
Shooters at the 1983 Pan American Games
Police officers killed in the line of duty
Ecuadorian police officers
Deaths by firearm in Ecuador
Male murder victims
Ecuadorian murder victims
People murdered in Ecuador
People from Guaranda
Pan American Games medalists in shooting
Medalists at the 1983 Pan American Games